Maaker is an Estonian surname. Notable people with the surname include:

Aleksander Maaker (1890–1968), Estonian folk musician
Juhan Maaker (1845–1930), Estonian folk musician
Villem Maaker (1891–1966), Estonian politician

See also
Maker (surname)

Estonian-language surnames